IF Karlstad Football is a Swedish football team in Karlstad, Värmland

The club was founded in 2019. In a controversial decision, Carlstad United and Karlstad BK merged with each other.

The club currently competes in Ettan Norra. They ended last season at 4th in the league. In August 2020, former Akropolis manager Konstantinos Panagopoulos joined the club as head coach. 

In February 2022, former England coach Sven-Göran Eriksson joined the club as an advisor for the club.

Konstantinos got sacked in July 2022.

Season to season

References 

Sport in Karlstad
Football clubs in Värmland County
Association football clubs established in 2019
2019 establishments in Sweden